Women's International Democratic Federation (WIDF) is an international organization with the stated goal of working for women's rights. It was established in 1945 and was most active during the Cold War. It initially focussed on anti-fascism, world peace, child welfare and improving the status of women. During the Cold War era, it was described as Communist-leaning and pro-Soviet. International Day for Protection of Children, observed in many countries as Children's Day on June 1 since 1950, was established by the Federation at its November 1949 congress in Moscow. The WIDF published a monthly magazine, Women of the Whole World, in English, French, Spanish, German, and Russian, with occasional issues in Arabic.

WIDF was founded in Paris in 1945, but it was later banned by French authorities and relocated to East Berlin, where it was supported by the East German government. Its first president was Eugenie Cotton, and its founding members included Tsola Dragoycheva and Ana Pauker. Later leaders included the Australian Freda Brown. The WIDF was one of the largest and "probably most influential international women's organizations of the post-1945 era" in the eastern bloc. At various points in its history, the WIDF enjoyed consultative status with the Economic and Social Council (ECOSOC) of the United Nations. It was at the initiation of representatives of the WIDF in the Commission on the Status of Women (CSW) at the United Nations that the UN declared the International Women's Year in 1975.

The WIDF's secretariat is located in São Paulo, Brazil. Philippine Congresswoman, Liza Maza, is the regional coordinator of WIDF in Asia.

Cold War

During the Cold War, the Congress of American Women was the affiliate organization of the WIDF in the United States. In 1949, members of the Congress of American Women were targeted by the Committee on Un-American Activities of the House of Representatives (HUAC).  In HUAC's report, the WIDF was named as a "communist front" organization.

Scholars have subsequently described the WIDF an active feminist organization advocating for women's rights, and stated that "Cold War" stereotypes continue to impact the legacy of this organization, effectively erasing it from the history of international women's movements. The WIDF played an important role in supporting women's anti-colonial struggles in Asia, Africa, and Latin America.

Affiliates 
Congress of American Women → 
All-China Women's Federation
National Assembly of Women
National Federation of Indian Women
Democratic Women's League of Germany
National Union of Sahrawi Women
Women's Federation of Brazil

See also

 International Communist Women's Secretariat
 International Socialist Women's Conferences
 Socialist International Women

Other post-1945 international "communist fronts" 
International Association of Democratic Lawyers
International Federation of Resistance Fighters – Association of Anti-Fascists
International Organization of Journalists
International Union of Students
World Federation of Democratic Youth
World Federation of Scientific Workers
World Federation of Trade Unions
World Peace Council

Footnotes

Further reading
Yulia Gradskova, The Women’s International Democratic Federation, the Global South and the Cold War: Defending the Rights of Women of the ‘Whole World’?. New York: Routledge, 2022. ISBN 9780367504786
Elisabeth Armstrong, “Before Bandung: The Anti-Imperialist Women's Movement in Asia and the Women's International Democratic Federation.”  Signs: Journal of Women in Culture & Society. Winter2016, Vol. 41 Issue 2, p305-331

Katherine McGregor, “Indonesian Women, The Women's International Democratic Federation and the Struggle for ‘Women's Rights’, 1946–1965.” Indonesia & the Malay World. Jul2012, Vol. 40 Issue 117, p193-208.
Celia Donert, “Women's Rights in Cold War Europe: Disentangling Feminist Histories.” Past & Present. May2013 Supplement, p178-202
Francisca de Haan, “A Brief Survey of Women's Rights from 1945 to 2009.” UN Chronicle. 2010, Vol. 47 Issue 1, p56-59
Full text of the HUAC report on the Congress of American Women, including information about the founding of the WIDF in Paris in 1945.
Francisca de Haan, "Continuing Cold War Paradigms in the Western Historiography of Transnational Women’s Organisations: The Case of the Women’s International Democratic Federation (WIDF)," Women’s History Review 19, no. 4 (Sept. 2010): 547-573.
Michelle Chase, “Hands Off Korea: Women’s Internationalist Solidarity and Peace Activism in Early Cold War Cuba,” Journal of Women’s History 32.3 (2020).

External links

Latest version of the WIDF website (Dec.14, 2012) on the Wayback Machine. Only available in Portuguese.
 Women's International Democratic Federation (WIDF) Records Sophia Smith Collection, Smith College Special Collections
Women's International Democratic Federation (WIDF) Records at the International Institute for Social History (IISH) in the Netherlands

International women's organizations
Communist front organizations
Organizations established in 1945
International organisations based in Brazil
Women's wings of communist parties